In Spanish, cecina  is meat that has been salted and dried by means of air, sun or smoke.  The word comes from the Latin siccus (dry), via Vulgar Latin (caro) *siccīna, "dry (meat)".

Spain
Cecina is similar to ham and is made by curing cow, horse or rabbit meat. The best known cecina is Cecina de León, which is made of the hind legs of a cow, salted, smoked and air-dried in the provinces of León and Palencia in northwestern Spain, and has PGI status.

Latin America
The word cecina is also used to name other kinds of dried or cured meat in Latin America.

Mexico
In Mexico, most cecina is of two kinds: sheets of marinated beef, and a pork cut that is sliced or butterflied thin and coated with chili pepper (this type is called cecina enchilada or carne enchilada).  The beef version is salted and marinated and laid to dry somewhat in the sun. The marinated beef version can be consumed uncooked, similar to prosciutto. The pork "cecina enchilada" must be cooked before consumption.  The town of Yecapixtla is well known for its version of the dish, which varies from region to region.

See also

 Bresaola
 Pastırma
 Biltong
 Leonese cuisine
 List of dried foods
 List of smoked foods
 List of Mexican dishes
 List of Spanish dishes

References

External links

  Consejo Regulador de la Indicación Geográfica Protegida "Cecina de León", PGI Consortium
  Cecina de León elaboration

Dried meat
Spanish cuisine
Spanish products with protected designation of origin
Leonese cuisine
Smoked meat
Mexican cuisine